The Battle of Arras, fought on 25 August 1654, was a victory of a French army under Turenne against a Spanish army commanded by Don Ferdinand de Salis and the Prince de Condé. 

The place, held by a French garrison, was besieged by the Spaniards under the Great Condé. A relief army under Turenne, d'Hocquincourt and de la Ferté attacked the Spanish lines and totally routed them with a loss of at least 7,000 men. Condé succeeded in rallying the remainder of his army and made a masterful retreat to Cambrai.

Before the battle, Turenne risked exposing himself and his officers in order to reconnoitre the Spanish lines.  He was criticised for taking such risks by some of his officers, but the Duke of York, the future King James II of England, later observed that these officers realised their error after they realised that Turenne had worked out where to attack during these reconnaissances.  Turenne attacked at night, two hours before daybreak on 25 August.  D'Hocquincourt attacked the troops from Lorraine, Turenne attacked the Spanish and provided support for de la Ferté, whose attack was less successful.  In the morning Condé counter-attacked, falling on French troops who were pillaging the former Spanish camp.  De la Ferté panicked and abandoned some high ground.  Turenne rode up and placed some cannon on the high ground, forcing Condé to retreat.  The young Louis XIV visited the battlefield and saw the disparity between the numbers of French and Spanish dead.  This was Louis XIV's first victory against a foreign army.

Cyrano de Bergerac, who is the subject of the classic French play Cyrano de Bergerac by Edmond Rostand, participated in a siege of Arras in 1640, and not the battle of 1654.

References

Citations

Bibliography
 
 
 

1654 in France
Battles involving Spain
Battles involving France
Battle